Giancarlo Giammetti (born 5 February 1942) is an Italian businessman, known for his professional and personal association with Valentino Garavani. He is the founder with Valentino Garavani of the Valentino fashion house. He is the Honour President of Valentino. In 2006 he was inducted in the International Best Dressed List Hall of Fame.

Biography 
 Giancarlo Giammetti was born in Rome in 1942. He attended liceo classico at the Collegio San Gabriele in Rome. In the 1960s, when he was a student at the local faculty of architecture, he met Valentino Garavani and together they created the Valentino Company.

In 1989, he created with Valentino the Valentino Academy, a cultural and art exhibition space located near Valentino's atelier in Rome.

In 1998 the Valentino brand was sold to HDP, an Italian conglomerate, and, later, to the Marzotto group.

In popular culture
The relationship between Valentino and Giammetti and the events leading to their retirement and up the party in Rome, and the party itself, are covered in the 2008 film Valentino: The Last Emperor.

In 2013 Assoluline published Private: Giancarlo Giammetti a collection of photos "culled" from 57,000 personal pictures Giammetti had catalogued over the years.  A party, in Milan, was hosted by Italian Vogue editor Franca Sozzani to celebrate the book's release. The party was attended by Anna Wintour, Georgia May Jagger, Joan Smalls, Olivia Palermo, and many others.

See also
Thomas Ammann

References

External links 
 Sueddeutsche:Party in Rome (german)

Living people
Fashion designers from Rome
LGBT fashion designers
Italian LGBT people
1938 births